8th BSFC Awards
January 10, 1988

Best Film: 
 Hope and Glory 
The 8th Boston Society of Film Critics Awards honored the best filmmaking of 1987. The awards were given on 10 January 1988.

Winners
Best Film:
Hope and Glory
Best Actor:
Albert Brooks – Broadcast News
Best Actress:
Holly Hunter – Broadcast News
Best Supporting Actor:
R. Lee Ermey – Full Metal Jacket
Best Supporting Actress:
Kathy Baker – Street Smart
Best Director:
Stanley Kubrick – Full Metal Jacket
Best Screenplay:
James L. Brooks – Broadcast News
Best Cinematography:
Vittorio Storaro – The Last Emperor
Best Documentary:
Marlene
Best Foreign-Language Film:
My Life as a Dog (Mitt liv som hund) • Sweden

External links
Past Winners

References 
1987 Boston Society of Film Critics Awards Internet Movie Database

1987
1987 film awards
1987 awards in the United States
1987 in Boston
January 1988 events in the United States